Bang Phongphang is one of the two khwaengs (sub-districts) of Yan Nawa District, Bangkok, apart from Chong Nonsi. In December 2018 it had a population of 29,754 people, with total area of   
6.678 km2 (2.5784 mi2). The sub-district is also divided into seven communities.

Geography
Neighboring sub-districts are (from north clockwise) Thung Wat Don of Sathon District, Chong Nonsi, Bang Yo of Phra Pradaeng District (Samut Prakan Province), Rat Burana of Rat Burana District (across Chao Phraya River), and Bang Khlo of Bang Kho Laem District.

Naming
Since the area of Yan Nawa is next to the Chao Phraya River, people who live there are closely related to fishing in the river. Fishing equipment that people had used is called phongphang. The areas where people often used phongphang is near Khlong Lat Luang, Khlong Lat Pho, Khlong Song Khanong, Khlong Lat Thong Khung in Phra Pradaeng District of Samut Prakan Province and the area in front of Bang Phongphang School (which is now Chao Phraya Wittayakom School) which is near Wat Dan and Pak Khlong Mai.

Phongphang is a fishing tool consisting of main poles with net spreading over. There are two ears at the edge of the net and the other two ears under the net and need to be pressed onto the ground. A stick for pressing the net is called mai krachio (ไม้กระจิว). Mai krachio is a tool used for pressing the net onto the ground. It looks similarly to a net but there is an opening part at the bottom. It is around 10–16 wa (วา) or 20–32 m.

Places
Bhumibol Bridge
Rama IX Bridge
Int-Intersect Rama3
Chao Phraya Wittayakom School
Wat Dan
Wat Pariwat
Sathu Pradit Pier
Sathu Pradit Intersection

References

Yan Nawa district
Subdistricts of Bangkok
Populated places on the Chao Phraya River